The Salem Methodist Church is a historic church building at 1201 River Road in Cullasaja, an unincorporated community near Franklin, North Carolina. It is a single-story wood-frame structure with a prominent central bell tower with vernacular Gothic Revival styling. It was built in 1875 for a Methodist congregation. It was the third church built in the site, and is the second-oldest church building in Macon County. It served as a Methodist church until 1972, and was adapted for use as a community hall in 1976.

The building was listed on the National Register of Historic Places in 2013.

See also
National Register of Historic Places listings in Macon County, North Carolina

References

Methodist churches in North Carolina
Churches on the National Register of Historic Places in North Carolina
Churches completed in 1888
Churches in Macon County, North Carolina
National Register of Historic Places in Macon County, North Carolina